The Hours That Remain is the fourth album by Danish extreme metal band Mercenary, and the second released through Century Media Records. It is the first album to not include founding member Henrik "Kral" Andersen. The album blends heavy, thrash and melodic death metal, with almost all the vocals being clean ones. This was due to the absence of a dedicated growling vocalist, which Mercenary has otherwise employed. Growled vocals would return with 2008's Architect of Lies.

Track listing 

The import version of the CD contains two additional tracks.

Limited edition 
The limited edition of The Hours That Remain includes a DVD. The first song is a video of "Firesoul", songs 2 to 5 are from the live show at Dynamo 2005, and the rest are the official bootleg by the band live at Pratten.

DVD

Firesoul (Video Edit Version)  – 4:56
Intro — reDestructDead (Live Dynamo 2005)  – 5:45
Firesoul (Live Dynamo 2005)  – 8:04
Intro — World Hate Center (Live Dynamo 2005)  – 6:45
11 Dreams (Live Dynamo 2005)  – 8:20
Intro — reDestructDead (Live Pratten 2006)  – 6:18
Firesoul (Live Pratten 2006)  – 8:27
Sharpen the Edges (Live Pratten 2006)  – 5:42
Into the Sea — World Hate Center (Live Pratten 2006)  – 6:51
11 Dreams (Live Pratten 2006)  – 8:18

Personnel 
 Mikkel Sandager – vocals
 Jakob Mølbjerg – guitars
 Martin Buus – lead guitars
 Morten Sandager – keys
 Mike Park – drums

Additional musicians
Jacob Hansen – bass
Björn "Speed" Strid – vocals on "Redefine Me"
Marcus Bischoff – vocals on "Soul Decision"

Production
Jacob Hansen – producer
Ziggy – mastering
Travis Smith – art

References

2006 albums
Century Media Records albums
Mercenary (band) albums
Albums produced by Jacob Hansen